Altunizade is a neighborhood of the municipality of Üsküdar in Istanbul, Turkey. It is located on the Asian side of the city.

The location takes its name from Altunizade İsmail Zühtü Pasha (1806–1887), a wealthy civil servant in the Ottoman Empire, who established the settlement in an  utmost area on the Anatolian part of Istanbul in the 19th century. "Altunizade" means gold trader in the Ottoman Turkish language.

Education

Following universities maintain campuses in Altunizade: Istanbul 29 Mayıs University, Istanbul Şehir University, Istanbul Medeniyet University, Istanbul Sabahattin Zaim University, and Üsküdar University.

Places of interest

Places of interest in the neighborhood are Altunizade Mosque,  Capitol Shopping Center and Altunizade Acıbadem hastanesi

Transport
The motorway  runs just northeast of the neighborhood connecting the Bosphorus Bridge with Kadıköy. A number of İETT city bus lines and bus rapid transsit Metrobus line serve Altunizade. Also M-5 Subway runs in Altunizade.

References

Neighbourhoods of Üsküdar